The Archdiocese of Xalapa is a Latin Church ecclesiastical territory or archdiocese of the Catholic Church in Mexico. Its episcopal see is Xalapa, Veracruz. A metropolitan see, its ecclesiastical province includes the suffragan dioceses of Coatzacoalcos, Córdoba, Orizaba, Papantla, San Andrés Tuxtla, Tuxpan and Veracruz.

Bishops

Ordinaries
Francisco de Paula Suárez Peredo y Bezares (1863–1869) 
José María Mora y Daza (1870–1884); appointed Bishop of Tlaxcala (Puebla de los Angeles) 
José Ignacio Suárez Peredo y Bezares (1887–1894) 
Joaquín Acadio Pagaza y Ordóñez (1895–1919) 
St. Rafael Guízar Valencia (1919–1938) 
Manuel Pío López Estrada (1939–1968) 
Emilio Abascal y Salmerón (1968–1979) 
Sergio Obeso Rivera (1979–2007); elevated to Cardinal in 2018
Hipólito Reyes Larios (2007–2021); died in office
Jorge Carlos Patrón Wong (2021–present)

Coadjutor bishop
Sergio Obeso Rivera (1974–1979); future Cardinal

Auxiliary bishop
José Rafael Palma Capetillo (2016–present)

Other priest of this diocese who became bishop
Ignacio Lehonor Arroyo, appointed Bishop of Tuxpan, Veracruz in 1963
Sergio Cardinal Obeso Rivera, appointed Bishop of Papantla, Puebla, México in 1971; future Cardinal

History
19 March 1863: Erected as Diocese of Veracruz-Jalapa  (from Antequera-Oaxaca and Tlaxcala).
24 November 1922: Territory lost to Papantla.
29 June 1951: Elevated as Archdiocese of Veracruz-Jalapa. 
23 May 1959: Territory lost to San Andrés Tuxtla.
9 June 1962: Archdiocese of Jalapa erected; territory lost to Veracruz.
15 April 2000: Territory lost to Córdoba.
15 April 2000: Territory lost to Orizaba.

See also
Xalapa Cathedral ‎
List of Roman Catholic archdioceses in México

References

External links

Roman Catholic dioceses in Mexico
Roman Catholic ecclesiastical provinces in Mexico
A
Religious organizations established in 1863
Roman Catholic dioceses and prelatures established in the 19th century
1863 establishments in Mexico